Aénor of Châtellerault (also known as Aénor de Rochefoucauld) Duchess of Aquitaine (born  c. 1103 in Châtellerault, died March 1130 in Talmont) was the mother of Eleanor of Aquitaine, who became one of the most powerful women in Europe of her generation.

Aenor was a daughter of Viscount Aimery I, Viscount of Châtellerault and his wife, Dangereuse de L' Isle Bouchard (d. 1151). Her mother was willingly "abducted" by her future father-in-law, William IX of Aquitaine and became his mistress until his death in 1127. Aenor married William X of Aquitaine, the son of her mother's lover, in 1121 and had three children with him:

 Eleanor of Aquitaine, Duchess of Aquitaine, and wife of both Louis VII of France, and Henry II of England.
 Petronilla of Aquitaine, wife of Raoul I, Count of Vermandois.
 William Aigret (who died at the age of four with his mother at Talmont-sur-Gironde)

References

Sources

External links
Genealogy of Aenor de Châtellerault

1100s births
1130 deaths
People from Châtellerault
12th-century French women
12th-century French people
Duchesses of Aquitaine